Swanton is an unincorporated area and census-designated place (CDP) in Garrett County, Maryland, United States. Swanton is close to several recreation areas, such as Deep Creek Lake State Park and Jennings Randolph Lake. A church and a post office are located in the downtown area. The population was 58 at the 2010 census.

Anderson Chapel was listed on the National Register of Historic Places in 1984.

Demographics

References

Census-designated places in Garrett County, Maryland
Census-designated places in Maryland